Northern Pashto comprises the North Western and North Eastern dialects.

North Eastern 
Northeastern Pashto, is spoken primarily in the Khyber-Pakhtunkhwa province of Pakistan.

Yusapzai 
Yusufzai/Yusapzai Pashto is the most-spoken subdialect in the Northeastern Dialect.

Comparison:

Lexical Variation 
Even within the Yusapzai dialect; regional lexical variation is noted; as pointed out by Dr. Muhammad Ali Kaleem:

Sub-regional lexical variation 
Even with regions there can be minor differences in pronunciation. Example:

North Western 

The North Western is spoken in the east and northeast Afghanistan.

Phonological Variation 
There is regional difference in North Western Pashto in pronunciation of words:

References 

Pashto dialects
Languages of Afghanistan
Languages of Khyber Pakhtunkhwa